Austin Ikin (27 July 1930 – 20 November 2013) was a South African rower. He competed in the men's coxless four event at the 1948 Summer Olympics.

References

External links

1930 births
2013 deaths
South African male rowers
Olympic rowers of South Africa
Rowers at the 1948 Summer Olympics
Place of birth missing